Mikronisi ("small island", also known as Agios Pavlos , "St Paul") is an islet off the southern coast of the Greek island of Crete in the Libyan Sea. The islet is in a bay between the capes of Lithino and Kefalas, at Kommos, and close to Gortyn which was the ancient capital of Crete. It is administered within Heraklion regional unit.

Group of islets 

There are a group of four islets in the bay including Papadoplaka (to the west), Megalonisi (with the lighthouse), Mikronisi, and Trafos.

References 

Landforms of Heraklion (regional unit)
Mediterranean islands
Uninhabited islands of Crete
Islands of Greece